The 1848 Philadelphia mayoral election saw the reelection of John Swift to a twelfth overall non-consecutive term.

Electoral system
Beginning in 1839, the city operated under a mixed electoral system. Citizens voted for mayor in a general election. If a candidate receive a majority of the vote, they would be elected mayor. However, if no candidate received a majority, the City Council would select a mayor from the top-two finishers.

Results

References

1848
Philadelphia
Philadelphia mayoral
19th century in Philadelphia